Samuel Tamihana Henwood (born 28 March 1991) is a New Zealand rugby union player.

Early career

Born and raised in the small town of Opotiki in the Bay of Plenty region of New Zealand, Henwood initially turned out for the Bay's youth sides alongside future All Black, Sam Cane.   He attended Opotiki College for four years, then moved to Auckland for his final year of high school and attended King's College where he captained their first XV.

Senior career

Henwood debuted for Auckland during the 2011 ITM Cup season, however over the next few years he suffered multiple shoulder injuries which required reconstruction ending two of his seasons prematurely.   He made his return to the National Provincial Competition in 2014, playing for the Counties Manukau Steelers.   During the 2014–2015 and 2015–2016 off-seasons, he played in Portugal for Clube de Tecnico  who were coached by his former Counties Manukau teammate, Kane Hancy.

Overall he managed 2 appearances during the season.

References 

1991 births
Living people
Auckland rugby union players
Auckland University of Technology alumni
Chiefs (rugby union) players
Counties Manukau rugby union players
Green Rockets Tokatsu players
Hurricanes (rugby union) players
Kamaishi Seawaves players
New Zealand expatriate rugby union players
New Zealand rugby union players
People educated at King's College, Auckland
Rugby union flankers
Rugby union players from Ōpōtiki